Viktor Nikitich Lazarev (3 September (22 August O.S.) 1897 – 1 February 1976) was a Russian art critic and historian who specialized in medieval Byzantine, Russian, and Armenian religious art. He was the son of Nikita Lazarev, a Moscow architect, and was related by blood to Wassily Kandinsky.

Viktor studied at the Moscow State University in 1917—1920, and graduated from the Faculty of History and Philology. From 1924 to 1936 he worked as a Chief Curator, head of the art gallery department, and Deputy Director for Research at the Pushkin Museum of Fine Arts. In 1945 he was flown into Berlin to supervise the looting of art treasures from the Zoo Tower, including the Pergamon Altar. He later taught at the Moscow State University, and since 1961 headed the faculty of History of Foreign Art. The faculty library was named "Lazarev cabinet" in his honour. He is buried at the Vagankovo Cemetery.

Lazarev was a member of the USSR Academy of Sciences since 1943. The Art History Institute in Moscow owes its origin to Lazarev's efforts. His magnum opus is The History of Byzantine Painting, published in 2 volumes in 1947 and 1948. It was translated into Italian in an expanded and revised version as Storia della pittura bizantina (1967). Lazarev was also known for his many writings on the Italian Renaissance, its beginnings and the evolution of Western portrait painting.

Works 
 Portrait in European Art of the 17th Century, 1937
 Origins of the Italian Renaissance, 1956-1959
 Andrei Rublev and Rublev's School, 1966
 Old Italian Masters, 1972
 Kievan Rus' Mosaics and Frescoes, 1973
 Byzantine and Kievan Rus' Art, 1978

References 

1897 births
1976 deaths
Soviet art historians
Soviet male writers
20th-century male writers
Recipients of the USSR State Prize
Corresponding Members of the USSR Academy of Sciences
Moscow State University alumni
Academic staff of Moscow State University
Burials at Vagankovo Cemetery
Russian art curators
Historians of Byzantine art
Corresponding Fellows of the British Academy
Foreign members of the Serbian Academy of Sciences and Arts